Lõpe may refer to several places in Estonia:

Lõpe, Hiiu County, village in Pühalepa Parish, Hiiu County
Lõpe, Ida-Viru County, village in Iisaku Parish, Ida-Viru County
Lõpe, Jõgeva County, village in Jõgeva Parish, Jõgeva County
Lõpe, Pärnu County, village in Koonga Parish, Pärnu County

See also
Lope (disambiguation)